The Asia/Oceania Zone was one of three zones of regional competition in the 2007 Fed Cup.

Group I
Venue: Scenic Circles Hotel Tennis Centre, Christchurch, New Zealand (outdoor hard) 
Date: 16–21 April

The ten teams were divided into two pools of five teams. The top teams of each pool played-off against each other to decide which nation progresses to the World Group II Play-offs.

Pools

Play-offs

  advanced to the World Group II Play-offs.

Withdrawals
Sri Lanka and Syria were scheduled to compete, but withdrew because of a terrorist threat.

See also
Fed Cup structure

References

 Fed Cup Profile, Thailand
 Fed Cup Profile, Uzbekistan
 Fed Cup Profile, India
 Fed Cup Profile, Chinese Taipei
 Fed Cup Profile, South Korea
 Fed Cup Profile, Singapore
 Fed Cup Profile, Jordan
 Fed Cup Profile, New Zealand

External links
 Fed Cup website

 
Asia Oceania
Sport in Christchurch
Tennis tournaments in New Zealand
Fed
Fed